The 2002 AFC U-17 Championship was the 10th AFC U-17 Championship, which was held in the United Arab Emirates. South Korea defeated Yemen in the final round.

Teams banned
Following the 2000 AFC U-17 Championship, in May 2001, 16 players were banned from international football for two years following X-ray tests that suggested they were at least 19 years old. Of the teams involved, Thailand had two. Nepal did not allow its players to be tested. These teams were banned from the 2002 AFC U-17 Championship.

Qualification

Group 1 : 
Group 2 : 
Group 3 : 
Group 4 : 
Group 5 : 
Group 6 : 
Group 7 : 
Group 8 : 
Group 9 : 
Group 10 : 
Group 11 : 
Host :

Group stage

The first and second placed teams from each group qualified in addition to the two best third-placed teams qualified for the knockout stage.

Group A

Group B

Group C

Ranking of third-placed teams

Knockout stage

Bracket

Quarter-finals

Semi-finals

Third place match

Final

Winners

Tournament ranking

Teams qualified for 2003 FIFA U-17 World Championship

Sources
Rssf.com

 
Under
International association football competitions hosted by the United Arab Emirates
AFC
2002 in youth association football
AFC U-17 Championships